The 2013 American Athletic Conference men's soccer season is the 18th season of men's varsity soccer in the conference originally known as the Big East Conference. Following a period of turmoil and near-constant turnover of membership, culminating in a split into two leagues along football lines, the schools that sponsor FBS football sold the Big East name to the non-FBS schools, which began operating as the Big East Conference in July 2013. The FBS schools are operating under the original Big East charter with the new name of American Athletic Conference.

This was the final season n the Big East/American for two member schools. Louisville and Rutgers will leave in 2014, respectively for the  ACC and Big Ten.

Changes from 2012 
 The so-called "Catholic 7" schools—DePaul, Georgetown, Marquette, Providence, St. John's, Seton Hall, and Villanova—left to form the new Big East.
 Three schools left for the ACC. Pittsburgh and Syracuse left for all sports including FBS football; Notre Dame left for non-football sports but remains an FBS independent.
 Memphis, SMU, and UCF joined from Conference USA. Temple, which had joined the original Big East for football in 2012, brought in the rest of its athletic program (except three sports not sponsored by The American) from the Atlantic 10 Conference.

Season outlook

Teams

Stadia and locations

Standings

AAC Tournament

Results

Statistics

See also 

 American Athletic Conference
 2013 American Athletic Conference Men's Soccer Tournament
 2013 NCAA Division I men's soccer season
 2013 in American soccer

References 

 
2013 NCAA Division I men's soccer season